Bulanikha is a rural locality (a selo) and the administrative center of Bulanikhinsky Selsoviet, Zonalny District, Altai Krai, Russia. The population was 2,463 as of 2013. There are 17 streets.

Geography 
Bulanikha is located 22 km north of Zonalnoye (the district's administrative centre) by road. Parizhskaya Kommuna is the nearest rural locality.

References 

Rural localities in Zonalny District